Dry-tooling is a form of rock climbing in which ice axes are used to climb rock that is not covered in snow or ice.  It has its origins in mixed climbing, ice climbing and more recently sport climbing. Dry tooling is controversial among many climbers. Some favour it as a new and exciting kind of climbing, while others dislike it for its nontraditional methods and the permanent damage it can cause to certain, generally softer, rock formations.

History 

The evolution of modern dry tooling started in the 1990s with British alpinist Stevie Haston in Italy establishing routes such as Welcome to the Machine, 009, and Empire Strikes Back (Grotta Haston, Cogne). In the United States and Canada, Jeff Lowe was influential in raising the standards, climbing routes such as Octopussy M8.

A common theme of these early routes was that rock was climbed to reach free hanging ice falls—ice falls that do not touch the ground. Protection was also mostly traditional hand placed pegs, nuts and ice screws. This reflects the influences of alpine climbing, mixed climbing, ice climbing of the early innovators.

More recently dry tooling has tended towards secure bolted protection and may not involve the presence of ice at all. The route is bolted and climbers can clip as they dry tool, similar in style to a sport climbing route.

Competitions 
Unsurprisingly the rise in standards was reflected in a surge of interest in competitions on purpose built climbing structures. These competitions mixed ice climbing with dry tooling on artificial features such as metal, stone, or resin climbing holds, and free hanging wooden logs/ ice bollards. Each year The UIAA Ice Climbing World Cup is held at a number of venues around the world. What was claimed to be the "World's First Indoor Dry Tooling Competition" was held in Glasgow, Scotland in March, 2003.

Drytooling competitions in the UK have evolved from the Scottish Masters to Scottish Tooling Series (2008-2013) and now in the form of the British Tooling Series and Scottish Mixed Masters 2014.

Equipment 
Dry tooling is performed using a combination of ice axes with either crampons or rock shoes.  The evolution in equipment has been driven by the competition scene, resulting in leashless ice axes and lightweight ice climbing boots with integral crampons. Heel spurs were popular in the 1990s but their use has since been frowned upon and they have since been banned from competitions. Many of these evolutions have been embraced by the wider winter climbing community.

Venues 
Dry-tooling is practiced in areas such as Ouray, Colorado which is also the birthplace of modern mixed ice climbing. There are also many dry-tooling areas in Europe such as Kandersteg and Zinal. In the UK you can also climb on the esoteric chalk cliffs of the south coast.

Indoor 
Many indoor climbing walls are now offering dry tooling to their customers. This tendency has also been reflected by the interest in indoor dry-tooling and making it attractive to a new crowd of climber without the alpine heritage.

A recent development of indoor dry tooling is the use of a special ice axe that has rubber loops on the ends instead of a sharp pick. The rubber loop can be hooked over the existing holds without damage to the wall or danger to the climber. Using this type of axe allows dry-toolers and ordinary climbers to use the wall alongside each other safely and conveniently.  These tools are called DRY ICE Tools.  There is also a youth-sized indoor ice climbing training tool called Icicles.

Significant ascents 
Octopussy M8, Colorado. 1994
Fatman and Robin M9, Colorado
Captain Hook M10, Italy.
Empire Strikes Back M11, Italy. 2000
Musashi M12, Canada.
Law and Order M13, Austria.
Vertical Limits M12, Switzerland.
Jedi Master, M11, Italy
Powerdab, M13 (onsight), United Kingdom. 2014

References

External links 

 m9entertainment - - Mixed Ice Climbing Media & Podcasts
 Scott Muir. Dry-Tooling - What's it all About? The Scottish Mountaineer, issue 20.
 Dry Tooling UK, an information and community site for dry tooling in the United Kingdom.

Types of climbing